The 1950 New Hampshire Wildcats football team was an American football team that represented the University of New Hampshire as a member of the Yankee Conference during the 1950 college football season. In its second year under head coach Chief Boston, the team compiled a perfect 8–0 record (4–0 against conference opponents) and won the Yankee Conference championship.

Schedule

References

New Hampshire
New Hampshire Wildcats football seasons
Yankee Conference football champion seasons
College football undefeated seasons
New Hampshire Wildcats football